Attila Szabó (born 3 May 1963) is a Hungarian sprint canoeist who competed from 1987 to 1995. He won eleven medals at the ICF Canoe Sprint World Championships with five golds (C-2 500 m: 1991, C-4 200 m: 1995, C-4 500 m: 1993, 1994, 1995), five silvers (C-4 200 m: 1994, C-4 500 m: 1989, 1990; C-4 1000 m: 1989, 1990), and one bronze (C-1 500 m: 1987).

Szabó also finished fourth in the C-1 500 m event at the 1988 Summer Olympics in Seoul.

References

1963 births
Canoeists at the 1988 Summer Olympics
Hungarian male canoeists
Living people
Olympic canoeists of Hungary
ICF Canoe Sprint World Championships medalists in Canadian
20th-century Hungarian people